The 2015 Canadian American Association of Professional Baseball season began on May 21, 2015 and ended on September 7, 2015. Following the regular season, the playoffs were held. It was the 11th season of operations for this professional independent baseball league. The Trois-Rivières Aigles won their first championship title in just their third season, defeating the New Jersey Jackals in the fifth and deciding game of the league championships, played on September 20, 2015. 

In particular, this season was notable for the tours of the traveling Garden State Grays and the Japanese team, Shikoku Island All-Stars.  This season was also the first time since 2011 that the league playoff bracket had both a semifinals round and a championship round. From 2012-2014, since there were very few teams in the league and only the top two made the playoffs, there was only a championship round played.

Season summary

Shikoku Island League all-star team
The Shikoku Island All-Stars played 16 games in June 2015 against all of the Can-Am League teams, finishing 6-10.

Garden State Grays
This was the first time since the 2007 season that the Grays played in the Can-Am League. The other time that the Grays played was in the Can-Am League's inaugural year in 2005. Unfortunately, the Grays finished with an appalling 13-47 record. Since then, they never returned to the Can-Am League.

Standings

* Teams not eligible for playoffs

Playoffs

Bracket

Championship finals

New Jersey vs. Trois-Rivieres

Attendance

References

External links
Can-Am League website

2015 in baseball
Canadian American Association of Professional Baseball
2015 in Canadian sports
2015 in American sports